Zacoccia was a king of Mozambique who, according to the Lusiad, welcomed Vasco da Gama  believing him to be a
Muslim. Upon discovering that Vasco da Gama was a Christian he conceived to have him killed. When the agent he employed failed, he committed suicide.

References

History of Mozambique
Mozambican royalty